Dehnow-e Ghuri (also Romanized as Dehnow-e Ghūrī) is a village in Somghan Rural District, Chenar Shahijan District, Kazerun County, Fars Province, Iran. At the 2006 census, its population was 659, in 129 families.

References 

Populated places in Chenar Shahijan County